The transverse grand pyrg, scientific name Pyrgulopsis cruciglans, is a species of very small freshwater snail with a gill and an operculum, an aquatic gastropod mollusk in the family Hydrobiidae. This species is endemic to the United States.

References

Molluscs of the United States
Pyrgulopsis
Gastropods described in 1998
Taxonomy articles created by Polbot